Bromelia unaensis  is a species of Bromelia from Brazil.

References

External links
 
 

unaensis